Lucky Strike is a settlement located in the nation of Belize. It is a mainland village located at mile 30½ in Belize District on the Old Northern Highway, just three miles from the Maya Site of Altun Ha.

Populated places in Belize District
Belize Rural North